Mlikh is a mountain village in the Jezzine district, located in the South Governorate in Southern Lebanon. It lies on the Al Rihan mountain chain (around 4,000-7,000 feet above sea level, Mlikh is located at around 1,280 meters and higher at other peaks above sea level). The village is located on a number of mountains peaks, and between the mountain peaks.

History
In 1838, Eli Smith noted  Melikh   as a village by Jezzin, "East of et-Tuffa".

On the night of 12-13 September 1997 four Hizbullah members were killed in an Isareli ambush near Mlikh. Amongst the dead was 18-year-old Hadi Nasrallah, son of Hassan Nasrallah. Three months later, 12 December, another Hizbollah fighter was killed during an attack on a SLA compound near Mlikh.

Etymology

The word Mlikh may derive from the Semitic (Aramaic) word for "king". The root of Mlikh or king in the Semitic language is mlk.  The word malik derives from the Semitic root mlk.  Mlikh or mlk may also possibly be connected to Moloch since moloch derives from the same mlk root, and means "to rule". In Phoenician (where it is theorized "mlk" derives from) mlk has been linked to "king", possibly deriving from pagan Melqart.

Demographics
The natives of Mlikh are Shia and Maronite-Christians. The village houses one church, one mosque, and a Hussainiya.

Historical significance
The village is home to a number of ancient "prophets" whose tombs are located on the mountain peaks surrounding Mlikh, including Burkab, and Sujud (believed by some scholars to be Oholiab, however his existence or this connection cannot be fully verified). Shia and Christian inhabitants of the village and of the southern Lebanese region make pilgrimages to the tombs.

Notable people
Amal Abou Zeid (born 5 June 1953) is a member of the Lebanese parliament, and is from Mlikh. He is a member of the National Commission for Economy, Trade, Industry and Planning in the Lebanese Parliament, since December 2016.

References

Bibliography

 

   
Populated places in Jezzine District
Maronite Christian communities in Lebanon
Shia Muslim communities in Lebanon